The Latvian Baseball League (LBL) is the men's amateur league in Latvia. It started play in 2003 and continues to this day. The season runs from May to September and games are played on the weekends.

Latvian Champions 

Baseball in Latvia
Baseball leagues in Europe
2003 in baseball
Sports leagues established in 2003